Hashli may refer to:
 Hashli, Kamyaran
 Hashli, Sanandaj